Evan Gilbert Wright (1903-1994) was a Welsh Anglican priest.

Wright was educated at  St David's College, Lampeter. He was Archdeacon of Bangor from 1962 to 1973.

References

1903 births
Archdeacons of Bangor
20th-century Welsh Anglican priests
Alumni of the University of Wales, Lampeter
1994 deaths
Alumni of St Michael's College, Llandaff